This is a list of the notable lakes of Indonesia. Indonesia has 521 natural lakes and over 100 reservoirs, covering approximately 21,000 km². The total volume of water held is approximately 500 km³. The largest lake, by both area and volume, is Lake Toba in Sumatra. It holds 240 km³ of freshwater, and is the largest lake body in Southeast Asia.

Indonesia has 3 of the 20 deepest lakes in the world - Lake Matano in Sulawesi (590 m), Lake Toba in Sumatra (505 m),  and Lake Poso in Sulawesi (450 m). The only lake in Indonesia having a cryptodepression (the bottom of the lake is below sea level) is Lake Matano.

The lakes and reservoirs supply water for personal and commercial uses, and support economic activities like fisheries, hydropower, irrigation, transport, and recreation. They assist in preventing floods, and are important ecological entities.

Sumatra

Kalimantan

Java

Lesser Sunda Islands

Sulawesi

Papua

See also 

 List of lakes

References 

Indonesia
Lakes